Rise to Ruin is the seventh and final studio album by Dutch death metal band Gorefest. It was released in 2007 through Nuclear Blast. The album was released on 25 September 2007 in the US.

Track listing 
 "Revolt" – 5:27
 "Rise to Ruin" – 4:48
 "The War on Stupidity" – 4:14
 "A Question of Terror" – 5:35
 "Babylon's Whores" – 9:09
 "Speak When Spoken To" – 4:19
 "A Grim Charade" – 5:08
 "Murder Brigade" – 4:15
 "The End of It All" – 5:46

Bonus tracks digipak edition 
"Surrealism" – 04:29
"Dehumanization" – 03:32

Band members 
 Jan Chris de Koeijer – vocals, bass guitar
 Frank Harthoorn – guitar
 Boudewijn Bonebakker – guitar
 Ed Warby – drums
Jacob Bredhal – additional vocals on "Revolt" and "Speak When Spoken To"

References 

2007 albums
Gorefest albums
Nuclear Blast albums